Nick Bougas (born 1955) is an American documentary film director, illustrator and record producer. As a cartoonist, he has used the pen name A. Wyatt Mann to produce racist, antisemitic and homophobic cartoons.

Career
Bougas directed the mondo film Death Scenes, hosted by Church of Satan founder Anton LaVey. The film was followed by Death Scenes 2 in 1992, and Death Scenes 3 in 1993.

In 1993, he directed the documentary Speak of the Devil: The Canon of Anton LaVey, a profile of LaVey.

Bougas has directed several other films, such as the 1994 documentary The Goddess Bunny, about disabled transgender tap dancing artist Sandie Crisp.

In 1998, Bougas released the album Celebrities... At Their Worst!, a collection of comedic audio blunders by such celebrities as Elvis Presley, Casey Kasem, Paul Anka, and John Wayne.

As an illustrator, Bougas has worked with writer and publisher Jim Goad on such publications as Answer Me!

A. Wyatt Mann 
According to a 2015 BuzzFeed News report, Bougas used the pseudonym "A. Wyatt Mann", (phonetically: 'a white man') to produce overtly racist and antisemitic cartoons in the late 1980s and early 1990s.

Besides Black people and Jews, his cartoons occasionally targeted other minorities, including gay people and feminists. Many of them were published at the time by white supremacist Tom Metzger and Feral House publisher Adam Parfrey. Bougas has never publicly confirmed his authorship; however, his identity as Mann was confirmed by multiple people who worked with him at the time, and in captions of photos taken at various events.

The Mann cartoons have been widely reused as hateful memes by white supremacists, various internet trolls, and later, the alt-right. One cartoon in particular, a stereotypical caricature of a Jewish person referred to as the "Happy Merchant", became one of the most popular antisemitic images on the internet. It has been reused, modified and parodied multiple times, eventually becoming part of the visual language of websites such as Reddit and 4chan.

Bougas' work as Mann has frequently been combined by Internet trolls with cartoons by political cartoonist Ben Garrison, which Garrison has said generates confusion between the two artists.

Selected filmography
Death Scenes (1989)
Death Scenes 2 (1992)
Death Scenes 3 (1993)
Speak of the Devil: The Canon of Anton LaVey (1993)
The Goddess Bunny (1994)
Serial Killers (1994)

References

External links
 Nick Bougas at Discogs
 

American documentary film directors
Living people
1955 births
American humorists
American film producers
American male screenwriters
American illustrators
American Satanists
English-language film directors
People from Savannah, Georgia
Record producers from Georgia (U.S. state)
Film directors from Georgia (U.S. state)
Screenwriters from Georgia (U.S. state)
Race-related controversies
Cartoon controversies
Antisemitism in literature
American white supremacists